Robert Owens (born August 17, 1961) is an American songwriter, record producer, DJ and singer, best known for his work with the Chicago house group Fingers Inc. in the mid-1980s.  As a solo artist, he has placed several songs on the Hot Dance Music/Club Play chart, two of which hit number-one: "I'll Be Your Friend" (1992), and "Mine to Give" (2000, a collaboration with Photek).

Biography
Though electronica has typically been a producer's medium (and the few vocalists who succeed are usually women), Robert Owens became one of the people associated with the late-1980s golden era of Chicago house. Born in Ohio, United States, Robert Owens grew up singing in church, but years later, he was working as a DJ in 1985, when he met Chicago producer Larry Heard. The pair formed Fingers Inc., along with Ron Wilson, and they released a few singles ("You're Mine"/"It's Over") plus the 1988 album, Another Side. The group disbanded quickly, as Heard's burgeoning solo-production career (as Mr. Fingers) took priority.

Owens had already released recordings on his own - "Bring Down the Walls" and "I'm Strong" made for Alleviated (with production from Heard), and he signed a solo contract with 4th & B'way Records. His 1990 album Rhythms in Me lost visibility soon after within the quickly disintegrating Chicago house scene. (One of his best-known features of the late 1980s, "Tears",  appeared with the names of Frankie Knuckles and producer Satoshi Tomiie.)

By 1996, he had returned to dance music with "Ordinary People": a two-part EP recording for Musical Directions. He joined up with Tomiie (again) and Cevin Fisher in 1999, to make a track from Tomiie's Full Lick LP. One year later, in 2000, Owens appeared on the Photek hit "Mine to Give".

In 2003, he joined with drum and bass act London Elektricity to provide the vocals for their album Billion Dollar Gravy.

He collaborated with Coldcut on their album Sound Mirrors, on the track "Walk a Mile in My Shoes" in 2006.

He collaborated with Rob Pearson on single "Escape from the Madness" which was released on Plastic City in 2007.

In 2011, he collaborated with the Brookes Brothers on their single "Beautiful", which was released on the Breakbeat Kaos label. Later on in the same year he collaborated with Dutch drum and bass producer Icicle, and featured on the tracks "Step Forward" and "Redemption", which appeared on Icicle's debut album Under the Ice released in April 2011 on Shogun Audio.

In 2012, he featured on Mosca's song "Accidentally" from the Eva Mendes EP and on Orgue Electronique's album Strange Paradise with the song "Our House".

In 2013, he released the single "Trusting Me" taken from the vocal collaboration album Features by Kris Menace. The video of the single was premiered by MTV Iggy in the US.

Discography

Albums
Rhythms in Me,  4th & B'way/Island/PolyGram Records, 1990
Love Will Find its Way: The Best of Robert Owens, Unisex Records, 2002
Night-Time Stories, Compost Records, 2008
Art, Compost Records, 2010

Singles
 "Tears"
 "Tell Me"
 "Far Away"
 "I'll Be Your Friend"
 "Ordinary People"
 "Love Will Find Its Way"
 "I'm Strong"
 "Picking Up The Pieces"
 "A Thing Called Love"
 "In Love Forever"
 "Can You Feel It"
 "Never No More Lonely"
 "After The Rain"
 "Bring Down The Walls"
 "Mine To Give"
 "Mine To Give" (David Morales Happy Mix)
 "I Think To Myself" (w/ Luke Corradine / Roebeck)
 "Last Night a DJ Blew My Mind" (w/ Fab Four)
 "If"
 "A Greater Love" (w/ DJ Spen)
 "Love Someone" (w/ Atjazz)
 "I Go Back" (w/ Harry Ramero)
 "Escape from the Madness" (w/ Rob Pearson)
 "Fly Free" (w/ Ralf Gum)
 "Candlelight" (w/ Mercury)
 "Love is a Drug" (w/ Audiofly)

Compilation albums featuring Owens
 The Original Chicago House Classics: Full Length 12-Inch Mixes from the Godfathers of House, Demon Music Group Ltd., 2002
 The Kings of House: Compiled & Mixed by Masters At Work, Rapster/BBE Records, 2005
 Renaissance: The Masters Series, Part 9, Renaissance Recordings, 2007

See also
List of number-one dance hits (United States)
List of artists who reached number one on the US Dance chart

References

External links
 Robert Owens artist page, Discogs, 2008, Web page: Robert Owens artist page on Discogs.
 Robert Owens RBMA video lecture session
 Larry Heard RBMA video lecture session
 Robert Owens artist page on Discogs

1961 births
Living people
House musicians
Island Records artists
RCA Records artists
American house musicians
American male singers
American soul singers
American dance musicians
Musicians from Ohio